Xo or XO may refer to:

Food and drink
 XO sauce, a spicy seafood sauce
 XO, a grade of cognac, meaning "extra old"

Music
 XO (record label), a record label founded by artist the Weeknd
 "XO / The Host", a song by the Weeknd from his third mixtape Echoes of Silence
 XO (Elliott Smith album) (1998)
 XO (Leathermouth album) (2009)
 "XO" (song), a 2013 song by Beyoncé
 "XO", a song by The Eden Project
 "XO", a song by girl group Citizen Queen (2022)
 "XO", a song by Fall Out Boy from From Under the Cork Tree
 "XO", a 2010 song by Mike Posner from 31 Minutes to Takeoff
 "X.O.", a song by Luniz from the 1996 film soundtrack Original Gangstas

Science and technology
 XO Telescope or its exo-planet survey
 OLPC XO, a laptop produced by the One Laptop per Child association
 XO sex determination system, a chromosomal system used to designate sex of some species of insects, arachnids, and mammals
 XO, heterogametic male designation under this system
 Turner syndrome, a genetic condition in which one of the sex chromosomes is absent
 Xanthine oxidase, an enzyme that catalyzes the oxidation of hypoxanthine to xanthine
 Crystal oscillator (deprecated abbreviation: XO), an electronic circuit

Other uses
 XO Communications, a telecom company
 XO Group, a media company
 Super Robot Wars XO, a 2006 tactical role-playing video game
 Executive officer or XO, as in a military or police force
 Kisses and Hugs or XO
 LTE International Airways's IATA airline code
 Xiomara "Xo" Villanueva, a character on Jane the Virgin

See also
 Chi Omega ("ΧΩ"), a National Panhellenic Conference women's fraternity 
 Executive order (disambiguation), an edict by a member of the executive branch of a government
 Exo (disambiguation), multiple terms
 OX (disambiguation)
 Tic-tac-toe, a game using X's and O's
 X's and O's (disambiguation)
 Xbox One (XBO), a video game console by Microsoft
 XOXO (disambiguation)